A negative-calorie food is food that supposedly requires more food energy to be digested than the food provides. Its thermic effect or specific dynamic action—the caloric "cost" of digesting the food—would be greater than its food energy content. Despite its recurring popularity in dieting guides, there is no evidence supporting the idea that any food is calorically negative. While some chilled beverages are calorically negative, the effect is minimal and requires drinking very large amounts of water, which can be dangerous, as it can cause water intoxication.

Controversy
There is no evidence to show that any of these foods have a negative calorific impact. Foods claimed to be negative in calories are mostly low-calorie fruits and vegetables such as celery, grapefruit, orange, lemon, lime, apple, lettuce, broccoli, and cabbage. However, celery has a thermic effect of around 8%, much less than the 100% or more required for a food to have "negative calories".

Diets based on negative-calorie food do not work as advertised but can lead to weight loss because they satisfy hunger by filling the stomach with food that is not calorically dense. A 2005 study based on a low-fat plant-based diet found that the average participant lost  over fourteen weeks, and attributed the weight loss to the reduced energy density of the foods resulting from their low fat content and high fiber content, and the increased thermic effect. Nevertheless, these diets are not "negative-calorie" since they bear energy. Another study demonstrated that negative-calorie diets (NCDs) have the same efficacy to low-calorie diets (LCDs) in inducing weight loss when both of these diets are combined with exercise.

Therefore, one stick of gum which contains around 10 kcal would require being chewed for one or more hours to reach "negative-calorie".

See also

 Diet
 Dieting
 Calorie restriction
 List of diets
 Very-low-calorie diet
 Fad diet
 Protein poisoning

References

Pseudoscience
Diets
Metabolism